French Polynesia's 2nd constituency is a French legislative constituency in French Polynesia.  It is currently represented by Nicole Sanquer of A here ia Porinetia.

Following the 2010 redistricting of French legislative constituencies, which came into application for the June 2012 legislative election, the boundaries of French Polynesia's two constituencies were redrawn so as to create a third constituency in the collectivity.  Since then, the 2nd constituency contains the
communes of Anaa, Arue,
Arutua, Fakarava, Fangatau, Fatu Hiva, Gambier, Hao, Hikueru, Hitiaa O Te Ra, Hiva Oa, Mahina, Makemo, Manihi, Napuka, Nuku Hiva, Nukutavake, Papara, Pirae, Puka Puka, Rangiroa, Tahuata, Taiarapu-Est, Taiarapu-Ouest, Takaroa, Tatakoto, Teva I Uta, Tureia, Ua Huka and Ua Pou.

Deputies

Election Results

2022

 
 
 
|-
| colspan="8" bgcolor="#E9E9E9"|
|-
 
 

 
 
 
 
 * The swing for Tapura Huiraatira includes the 2017 results of Nicole Sanquer, the then Tapura Huiraatira candidate, and the results of LREM, who now supported the party as part of the Ensemble Citoyens alliance.

** Sanquer previously stood for Tapura Huiraatira, before founding A here ia Porinetia. As such, her previous results are counted in the swing for the Tapura Huiraatira candidate.

2017

2012

References 

2